2017 Philadelphia Summer International was held in August 2017 in Philadelphia, Pennsylvania. Medals are awarded in men's and ladies' singles. It was organized by IceWorks Skating Club.

Entries
The International Skating Union published the list of entries on 21 August 2017.

Results

Ladies

Men

References 

International figure skating competitions hosted by the United States
Philadelphia Summer International
Sports competitions in Philadelphia
Philadelphia Summer International
Philadelphia Summer International
Philadelphia Summer International